Jeff Wang is a Taiwanese actor and television host. He was previously contracted to MediaCorp and was based in Singapore for over a decade. He was a prominently a full-time Mediacorp artiste from 1999 to 2010. As he decided to pursue a career in singing, he left MediaCorp in 2010 and returned to his native Taiwan.

Career
Wang was overall male champion on Star Search Singapore 1999 and was awarded a contract with MediaCorp. He began acting minor roles in various dramas and is best known for his role as the villain Ying Tiancheng in Holland V, which was voted the Top 10 Most Memorable Villains at the Star Awards 2007 anniversary special celebrating 25 years of Chinese drama. His big break in hosting came when he replaced Kym Ng and Bryan Wong as host of City Beat and was nominated for the Best Variety Show Host award twice. He has since hosted many programmes and events including the Chingay Parade, award-winning talk show Say It If You Dare and Project SuperStar.

Wang has diversified into singing. He wrote and sang the theme songs of several MediaCorp drama series which were nominated for the Best Theme Song several times. In 2009 he released his debut album Dream.Route. As he decided to pursue a career in singing, he left MediaCorp in 2010 and returned to his native Taiwan. His last drama was Devil Blues

Personal life
Wang secretly married his long-time girlfriend, a Singaporean, in 2008 and they have a son. He only revealed his marriage to the press in early 2011.

In 2008, Wang and some friends set up Xiao Bar Wang (小霸王), a chain of shops selling Taiwanese street snacks. It has expanded into Malaysia and is co-managed by fellow MediaCorp artistes Apple Hong and Ong Ai Leng. Wang received the SME One Asia Award (Emerging Award) in 2011.

Filmography

Television

Movies

Variety/Infotainment Shows

Accolades

References

External links
Profile on xin.msn.com

Taiwanese male television actors
Taiwanese Buddhists
Singaporean male television actors
Living people
Taiwanese male film actors
1976 births